Sclerocornea is a congenital anomaly of the eye in which the cornea blends with sclera, having no clear-cut boundary. The extent of the resulting opacity varies from peripheral to total (sclerocornea totalis). The severe form is thought to be inherited in an autosomal recessive manner, but there may be another, milder form that is expressed in a dominant fashion. In some cases the patients also have abnormalities beyond the eye (systemic), such as limb deformities and craniofacial and genitourinary defects.

According to one tissue analysis performed after corneal transplantation, the sulfation pattern of keratan sulfate proteoglycans in the affected area is typical for corneal rather than scleral tissue.

Sclerocornea may be concurrent with cornea plana.

References

External links 

Congenital Clouding of the Cornea - eMedicine; by Noah S Scheinfeld, MD, JD, FAAD and Benjamin D Freilich, MD, FACS

Eye diseases